Engine is the eponymous debut album by Engine, released September 21, 1999 on Metal Blade Records.

Track listing

Personnel
 Ray Alder – lead vocals
 Bernie Versailles – guitar
 Joey Vera – bass, producer, engineer
 Pete Parada – drums
 Bill Metoyer - mixing assistant
 Eddy Schreyer - mastering assistant
 Alex Solca - cover art and photographs
 Brian J Ames - layout

References

1999 albums
Engine (American band) albums